The Nathaniel Felton Houses are a pair of historic houses at 43 and 47 Felton Street in Peabody, Massachusetts.  The Peabody Historical Society owns and operates the homes as historic house museums.

The house of Nathaniel Felton Sr., at 47 Felton Street, was built .  The house of his son, Nathaniel Felton Jr., was built at a different location, and moved to its present location by his grandson.

The houses were listed on the National Register of Historic Places in 1982.

See also
National Register of Historic Places listings in Essex County, Massachusetts
List of the oldest buildings in Massachusetts

References

External links
Nathaniel Felton Senior & Junior Houses – Peabody Historical Society
Nathaniel Felton Sr. House – Essex National Heritage Area
Nathaniel Felton Sr. and Jr. Houses – Salem Witch Museum

Houses completed in 1644
Historic house museums in Massachusetts
Museums in Essex County, Massachusetts
Houses in Peabody, Massachusetts
Houses on the National Register of Historic Places in Essex County, Massachusetts
1644 establishments in Massachusetts
History of Peabody, Massachusetts